Jorunna efe is a species of sea slug, a dorid nudibranch, a shell-less marine gastropod mollusc in the family Discodorididae.

Distribution
This species was described from the Canary Islands.

References

Discodorididae
Gastropods described in 2014
Molluscs of the Canary Islands